Phillip Barnett (born June 3, 1990) is an American football wide receiver for the San Antonio Gunslingers of the National Arena League (NAL). He previously played for the Washington Valor of the Arena Football League (AFL) and played college football at the University of Toledo.

College career
Barnett signed a letter of intent with the University of Toledo to play football, however he never appeared in a single game for the Rockets.

Professional career

Cincinnati Commandos
Barnett signed with the Cincinnati Commandos of the Continental Indoor Football League (CIFL). Barnett helped the Commandos to an undefeated 2011 season, winning the 2011 CIFL Championship Game. Barnett returned to the Commandos in 2012, helping the Commandos claim another championship, this time in the Ultimate Indoor Football League (UIFL).

Texas Revolution
In 2013, the Commandos folded, and Barnett followed head coach Billy Back to the Texas Revolution of the Indoor Football League (IFL).

Nashville Venom
In 2014, Barnett once again followed head coach Billy Back, this time to the Nashville Venom of the Professional Indoor Football League (PIFL). Barnett was named the Offensive Player of the Year in the PIFL, helping the Venom to a 10-2 record, and a PIFL Championship.

Tampa Bay Storm
On March 20, 2015, Barnett was assigned to the Tampa Bay Storm of the Arena Football League (AFL).

Wichita Falls Nighthawks
On October 20, 2016, Barnett signed with the Wichita Falls Nighthawks. On April 27, 2017, Barnett was placed on the transfer list.

Cleveland Gladiators
On January 9, 2017, Barnett was assigned to the Cleveland Gladiators. On February 10, 2017, Barnett was placed on league suspension. On May 2, 2017, he was activated from league suspension. On June 12, 2017, Barnett was placed on reassignment. On June 14, 2017, Barnett was once again assigned to the Gladiators.

Washington Valor
On March 19, 2019, Barnett was assigned to the Washington Valor.

Jacksonville Sharks
On October 13, 2020, Barnett signed with the Jacksonville Sharks of the National Arena League (NAL).

Albany Empire
On May 27, 2021, Barnett was traded to the Albany Empire of the National Arena League (NAL).

San Antonio Gunslingers
On January 14, 2022, Barnett signed with the San Antonio Gunslingers of the National Arena League (NAL). On March 31, 2022, Barnett was released by the Gunslingers after being suspended indefinitely by the league.

Frisco Fighters
On April 6, 2022, Barnett signed with the Frisco Fighters of the Indoor Football League (IFL). Barnett was released on May 31, 2022.

San Antonio Gunslingers (second stint)
On June 2, 2022, Barnett signed with the San Antonio Gunslingers of the National Arena League (NAL) after having his suspension lifted by the league. On October 23, 2022, Barnett re-signed with the Gunslingers.

References

External links
Arena Football bio

Living people
1990 births
American football wide receivers
Cincinnati Commandos players
Texas Revolution players
Nashville Venom players
Tampa Bay Storm players
Wichita Falls Nighthawks players
Cleveland Gladiators players
Carolina Cobras (NAL) players
Washington Valor players
Players of American football from Ohio
Sportspeople  from Middletown, Ohio